Michelle Soto is a poet, educator, and community organizer in New York City.

Early life and education 
Michelle Soto was born in Brooklyn, NY on to an Ecuadorian and Puerto Rican family. When she was eight years old, she moved to Queens from Brooklyn where she lived for the majority of her life. However, she spent most of her time in Brooklyn until she left New York City to attend Bay Path University in Massachusetts. Currently, Soto is a fifth grade English special education teacher and has been involved with the East Harlem Tutorial Program for two years. Initially, while attending college, Soto did not know that she wanted to teach and took on a few interests. She first majored in legal studies with the intention of becoming a lawyer. However, once she realized that it was not of her interest, Soto then switched her major to English and took on a summer fellowship to teach at her former middle school. Upon realizing how there were a little number of teachers of color in schools, Soto discovered she wanted to become a teacher. Once she achieved her dream of teaching, Soto knew that she loves to work with young individuals who she believes must recognize their power and strength outside of the classroom and in their school.

Personal life 
Growing up in Williamsburg, Brooklyn and enriching herself in the culture, Soto felt inspired to be a writer after noting how much history was around her. Soto also learned how much gentrification was occurring in her old neighborhood; therefore, persuading her to write about it. Soto is deeply committed to teaching and firmly believes that her students, as well as her, have the potential to create change to the education system.

Literary Contributions and Themes in Writing 
Soto is a poet and author of the works Boricua (2017), Mamì (2017), and Pelo Malo (2015). She is a member of Project X, a well- known non-profit arts organization that was founded by longtime Bronx resident Noel Quiñones. Several subjects that Soto feels passionate to write about are such as her old neighborhood, the recent events occurring in Puerto Rico, her strong bond with her family, and more. She also enjoys reading the works her students have created and encourages them to see just how strong they truly are. Soto aspires for her work to open people's eyes about the struggles many people of color experience especially from the current political crisis, challenges people in Puerto Rico face, and much more topics. Coming from two families of mixed cultures, she likes hearing all about the stories her family shares with her. She has said that some of her favorite authors are Elizabeth Acevedo, José Olivarez, Aja Monet, Warsan Shire, and Brandon Melendez.

Self-Published Works 
Boricua (2017)

Mamì (2017)

Pelo Malo (2015)

References 

Writers from New York (state)
1995 births
Bay Path University alumni
Living people
American people of Ecuadorian descent
American women poets
21st-century American women